Borrazópolis is a municipality in the state of Paraná in the Southern Region of Brazil.

Notable residents
Silval Barbosa, Governor of the Brazilian state of Mato Grosso

See also
List of municipalities in Paraná

References